Assisi (also , ; from ) is a town and comune of Italy in the Province of Perugia in the Umbria region, on the western flank of Monte Subasio.

It is generally regarded as the birthplace of the Latin poet Propertius, born around 50–45 BC. It is the birthplace of St. Francis, who founded the Franciscan religious order in the town in 1208, and St. Clare (Chiara d'Offreducci), who with St. Francis founded the Poor Sisters, which later became the Order of Poor Clares after her death. The 19th-century Saint Gabriel of Our Lady of Sorrows was also born in Assisi.

History 
Around 1000 BC a wave of immigrants settled in the upper Tiber valley as far as the Adriatic Sea, and also in the neighbourhood of Assisi. These were the Umbrians, living in small fortified settlements on high ground. From 450 BC these settlements were gradually taken over by the Etruscans. The Romans took control of central Italy after the Battle of Sentinum in 295 BC. They built the flourishing municipium Asisium on a series of terraces on Monte Subasio. Roman remains can still be found in Assisi: city walls, the forum (now Piazza del Comune), a theatre, an amphitheatre and the Temple of Minerva (now transformed into the Church of Santa Maria sopra Minerva). In 1997, the remains of a Roman villa were also discovered containing several well-preserved rooms with frescoes and mosaics in a condition rarely found outside sites such as Pompei.

The Augustan age poet Propertius is considered to have been born in what is now the city of Assisi.

In 238 AD Assisi was converted to Christianity by bishop Rufino, who was martyred at Costano. According to tradition, his remains rest in the Cathedral Church of San Rufino in Assisi.

The Ostrogoths of king Totila destroyed most of the town in 545. Assisi then came under the rule of the Lombards as part of the Lombard and then Frankish Duchy of Spoleto.

The thriving commune became an independent Ghibelline commune in the 11th century. Constantly struggling with the Guelph Perugia, it was during one of those battles, the battle at Collestrada, that Francesco di Bernardone (Saint Francis of Assisi) was taken prisoner, setting in motion the events that eventually led him to live as a beggar, renounce the world and establish the Order of Friars Minor.

The city, which had remained within the confines of the Roman walls, began to expand outside these walls in the 13th century. In this period the city was under papal jurisdiction. The Rocca Maggiore, the imperial fortress on top of the hill above the city, which had been plundered by the people in 1189, was rebuilt in 1367 on orders of the papal legate, cardinal Gil de Albornoz.

In the beginning, Assisi fell under the rule of Perugia and later under several despots, such as the soldier of fortune Biordo Michelotti, Gian Galeazzo Visconti and his successor Francesco I Sforza, dukes of Milan, Jacopo Piccinino and Federico II da Montefeltro, lord of Urbino. The city went into a deep decline through the plague of the Black Death in 1348.

The city came again under papal jurisdiction under the rule of Pope Pius II (1458–1464).

In 1569 construction was started of the Basilica of Santa Maria degli Angeli. During the Renaissance and in later centuries, the city continued to develop peacefully, as the 17th-century palazzi of the Bernabei and Giacobetti attest.

Now the site of many a pilgrimage, Assisi is linked in legend with its native son, St. Francis. The gentle saint founded the Franciscan order and shares honours with St. Catherine of Siena as the patron saint of Italy. He is remembered by many, even non-Christians, as a lover of nature (his preaching to an audience of birds is one of the legends of his life).

During World War II Nazi Germany occupied Assisi in September 1943. To save Jews in Italy the Catholic Church started the Assisi Network and hid Jews in the city. As the Allies moved up Italy, Germany declared Assisi an open city and pulled out, turning the city over to Italian partisans. The 12th Royal Lancers (Prince of Wales) entered the city on 17 June 1944.  Colonel Valentin Müller, a German medical officer and a Catholic, was able to make Assisi a German hospital city for German troops in Italy in the summer of 1944, helping save Assisi from destruction, unlike Cassino.

Assisi was hit by two devastating earthquakes, that shook Umbria in September 1997. But the recovery and restoration have been remarkable, although much remains to be done. Massive damage was caused to many historical sites, but the major attraction, the Basilica di San Francesco, reopened less than 2 years later.

Main sights 
UNESCO collectively designated the Franciscan structures of Assisi as a World Heritage Site in 2000.

Churches 
 Basilica of San Francesco d'Assisi (St. Francis): The Franciscan monastery, il Sacro Convento, and the lower and upper church (Italian: Basilica inferiore and Basilica superiore) of St Francis were begun immediately after his canonization in 1228, and completed in 1253. The lower church has frescoes by the late-medieval artists Cimabue and Giotto; the upper church houses frescoes of scenes in the life of St. Francis previously ascribed to Giotto, but now thought to be by artists of the circle of Pietro Cavallini from Rome. The Basilica was badly damaged by a 5.5 earthquake on 26 September 1997, during which part of the vault collapsed, killing four people inside the church and carrying with it a fresco by Cimabue. The edifice was closed for two years for restoration.
Santa Maria Maggiore (St. Mary the Greater): earliest extant church in Assisi.
Cathedral of San Rufino (St. Rufinus): church with a Romanesque façade with three rose windows and a 16th‑century interior; part of it is built on a Roman cistern.
Basilica of Santa Chiara (St. Clare): church, begun in 1257, with its massive lateral buttresses, rose window, and simple Gothic interior; and 13th‑century frescoes and paintings. It contains the tomb of the namesake saint.
Basilica of Santa Maria degli Angeli (St. Mary of the Angels); a church which houses the Porziuncola.
Chiesa Nuova: church built over the presumed parental home of St. Francis
Santo Stefano: one of the oldest churches of Assisi.
Eremo delle Carceri: a small monastery with a church at a canyon above the town, where St. Francis retreated and preached to birds
Church of San Pietro (St. Peter): monastery built by the Benedictines in the 10th century and rebuilt in the 13th century. It has a rectangular façade with three rose windows; the Gothic chapel of the Holy Sacrament houses a triptych by Matteo di Gualdo.
Church of San Damiano is where Saint Clare and the Poor Clares lived and is the location of Saint Francis' conversion.

Other landmarks 

The town is dominated by two medieval castles. The larger, called Rocca Maggiore, is a massive reconstruction by Cardinal Albornoz (1366) and expanded by popes Pius II (polygonal tower, 1458) and Paul III (the cylindrical bastion near the entrance, 1535–1538). The smaller of the two was built in Roman era: it has been only partially preserved, a small portion and three towers being open to the public.

Other sights include:
the Roman amphitheater, built in the early 1st century AD. Its elliptical plan is identifiable from the medieval houses built around it, and from an arch of travertine cunei. The arena now houses a garden.
the Piazza del Comune ("Communal Square"), with the Palazzo del Capitano del Popolo (mid-13th century, featuring a series of merlons added in 1927), the adjoining Torre del Popolo ("People's Tower", 1305) the Palazzo dei Priori ("Palace of the Priors", 1275–1493). The fountains with three lions on the southern side date from the 16th century.
The Temple of Minerva, also facing the Piazza del Comune
The abbey of St. Benedict, founded in the 10th century on the Monte Subasio. Remains include the crypt (late 11th century), the apse and the external walls.

Art 
See also Art in Assisi

Assisi has had a rich tradition of art through the centuries and is now home to a number of well-known artistic works.

Artists Pietro Lorenzetti and Simone Martini worked shoulder to shoulder at Assisi. The Basilica of San Francesco d'Assisi includes a number of artistic works. Simone Martini's 1317 fresco there reflects the influence of Giotto in realism and the use of brilliant colours. Lorenzetti's fresco at the lower church of the Basilica includes a series of panels depicting the Crucifixion of Jesus, Deposition from the Cross, and Entombment of Christ. The figures Lorenzetti painted display emotions, yet the figures in these scenes are governed by geometric emotional interactions, unlike many prior depictions which appeared to be independent iconic aggregations. Lorenzetti's 1330 Madonna dei Tramonti also reflects the ongoing influence of Giotto on his Marian art, midway through his career.

Culture 

The Calendimaggio Festival takes place on the first four days of May ending on a Saturday. It is a re-enactment of medieval and Renaissance life in the form of a challenge between the upper faction (parte de sopra) with a blue flag and the lower faction of the town (parte de sotto) with a red flag. It includes processions, theatrical presentations, choirs, crossbow, flag-waving and dancing contests.

Assisi Embroidery is a form of counted-thread embroidery which has been practised in Assisi since the 13th century.

Today the town has many groups coming to enjoy the simple peace of St. Francis.  One such group has restored an 11th-century room and added altars to the world's religions. Other organizations, such as Assisi Performing Arts, complement Assisi's tranquillity with music and other cultural events.

Saints 
Assisi was the home of several saints. They include:

Agnes of Assisi
Clare of Assisi
Francis of Assisi
Gabriel of Our Lady of Sorrows
Rufinus of Assisi
Vitalis of Assisi
Sylvester of Assisi

Transport 
Assisi railway station, opened in 1866, forms part of the Foligno–Terontola railway, which also links Florence with Rome.

International relations

Twin towns – sister cities
Assisi is twinned with:

 Bethlehem, Palestine
 San Francisco, United States
 Santiago de Compostela, Spain
 Wadowice, Poland

Others 

The two major basilicas sited in Assisi (the only ones not in Rome) gave their name to the two major cities in California: San Francisco and St. Mary of the Angels at the Porziuncula.

Appearances in media

In video games
 One of the rally tracks in the Gran Turismo series is set in Città d'Aria, which is located in Assisi. This track appeared first in the Gran Turismo 4: Prologue.
 Counter-Strike map cs_italy is possibly based on between part of the town and South Tyrol.

Sources

External links 

 

 
Hilltowns in Umbria
Castles in Italy
World Heritage Sites in Italy